The Boxing Gandhis are an American alternative funk/soul band from Los Angeles founded by music producer David Darling (Brian Setzer, Meredith Brooks, Sprung Monkey). The group was signed to the record label Mesa Blue Moon in 1993 and scored a #5 hit on the Billboard Triple A (Adult Album Alternative) chart with the song "If You Love Me (Why Am I Dyin')" off their debut album after touring the US as opening act for the Dave Matthews Band and Big Head Todd and the Monsters.  The song's video also garnered a Billboard Music Award "Video of the Year" and was directed by Brian Lockwood.

Atlantic Records purchased Mesa Blue Moon and the group was signed to Atlantic Records and released Howard. The album failed to gain radio popularity and the band went on a brief hiatus. The group released an EP of new material in 2008 titled 3rd 2nd Chance and released a digital download-only EP on iTunes titled Brand New Start in 2011. "If You Love Me (Why Am I Dyin')" was featured in Episode 3 of the 2011 season of the HBO Original Series True Blood.

Personnel

1994 (album Boxing Gandhis)
David Darling - vocals, guitar, bass, percussion
Brie Darling (Howard) - vocals, percussion
Ernie Perez - vocals, saxophone
David Kitay - vocals, guitar, percussion
Alfredo Ballesteros - flute, sax
Ted Andriadis - keyboards
Carl Sealove - bass
Steve Samuel - drums

1996 (album Howard)
David Darling - vocals, guitar, bass, percussion
Brie Darling (Howard) - vocals, percussion
Ernie Perez - vocals, saxophone
Eric M. Fowler - vocals, guitar
Alfredo Ballesteros - flute, sax
Ted Andreadis - keyboards
Randy Landas - bass
Jamie Chez - drums

Current Lineup (as of 2011)
Brie Darling (Howard) - vocals, percussion
Ernie Perez - vocals, saxophone
Eric Fowler - vocals, guitar, percussion
Alfredo Ballesteros - flute, sax
Ted Andreadis - keyboards
Yukihide Takiyama - bass
Gary Pavlica - drums

Discography

Albums
Boxing Gandhis (1994, Mesa Records)
Howard (1996, Atlantic Records)
3rd 2nd Chance (2008, Independent)
Brand New Start (2011, Digital Release)

External links

Boxing Gandhis at last.fm

Boxing Gandhis at MySpace
Boxing Gandhis at Facebook

American funk musical groups
American soul musical groups
Musical groups from Los Angeles